The Maritime Trust is a Registered Charity in England, based at 2 Greenwich Church Street, London SE10 9BG.

It was founded in 1970 and amalgamated with the Cutty Sark Society in 1975, and has a permit to restore, preserve, and display to the public historic British ships.

Vessels owned by The Maritime Trust include:

Cutty Sark — Greenwich
Gipsy Moth IV — Greenwich

See also
List of museum ships

External links

Charities based in London
Royal Borough of Greenwich
Organizations established in 1970
1970 establishments in England